James Wright (September 19, 1900 – April 11, 1963) was an English born professional baseball pitcher. He played two seasons in Major League Baseball for the St. Louis Browns from 1927 to 1928, appearing in four career games.

External links

Major League Baseball pitchers
St. Louis Browns players
Terre Haute Browns players
Battle Creek Custers players
Terre Haute Tots players
Seattle Indians players
People from Hyde, Greater Manchester
Sportspeople from Greater Manchester
Major League Baseball players from the United Kingdom
Major League Baseball players from England
English baseball players
1900 births
1963 deaths